The Google effect, also called digital amnesia, is the tendency to forget information that can be found readily online by using Internet search engines. According to the first study about the Google effect, people are less likely to remember certain details they believe will be accessible online. However, the study also claims that people's ability to learn information offline remains the same. This effect may also be seen as a change to what information and what level of detail is considered to be important to remember.

History
The phenomenon was first described and named by Betsy Sparrow (Columbia University), Jenny Liu (University of Wisconsin–Madison) and Daniel M. Wegner (Harvard University) in their paper from July 2011. The study was conducted in four parts. The first part had subjects answer a number of both easy and difficult trivia questions, and then perform a modified Stroop task involving both everyday words and technology-related words such as screen and Google. Subjects were slower to respond to technology words, especially after difficult questions, indicating that trivia questions primed them to think of computers. In the second experiment, the subjects read a number of trivia statements. Half of them were led to believe the statements would be saved and available to look up later; the other half were explicitly instructed to attempt to remember them. Both groups were then tested on recall of the statements. In part three, subjects read and typed in trivia statements, and informed that their entry was erased, saved, or saved in a specific location. Afterwards, they were given a recognition task and asked whether they had seen the exact statement, whether it had been saved, and if the statement had been saved, where it had been saved. In the final part, subjects again typed trivia statements, and were told each had been saved in a generically-named folder (e.g. items, facts). They were then given two different recall tasks: one for the statements, and one for the specific folder in which each statement was saved.

The term "digital amnesia" was coined by Kaspersky Lab for the results of an unreviewed survey in 2015 by the security vendor, which said, "The results reveal that the 'Google Effect' likely extends beyond online facts to include important personal information." Instead of remembering details, 91 percent of people used the Internet and 44 percent used their smartphone. Kaspersky Lab surveyed 1000 consumers ranged from age 16 to 55+ in the United States. In most cases, people could not remember important information such as telephone numbers that should have been familiar, leading to the conclusion that they forgot the information because of the ease of finding it using devices.

Phenomenon 
The original 2011 study concluded with three main findings. First, people are primed to think of computers when asked general knowledge questions, even when they know the correct answer. In addition, this effect is especially pronounced if the question is difficult and the answer is unknown. Secondly, people do not tend to remember information if they believe it will be available to look up later. By contrast, an explicit instruction to remember the material does not have a significant effect on recall. Lastly, if the information is saved, people are much more likely to remember where the information is located than to recall the information itself. In addition, people tend to remember either the fact or the location, but not both; this effect persists even when the information is more memorable than the name of the location.

A 2012 study by Lav R. Varshney has since proposed that the Google effect can also be seen in doctoral theses, claiming that a longitudinal increase in the number of references cited reflects a tendency for improved memory of where to find relevant information (i.e. which papers contain the information), rather than of the information itself. Furthermore, a related phenomenon has been described in which information learned through the internet is recalled less accurately and with less confidence than information learned via an encyclopedia. Additionally, those recalling information learned via the Internet showed decreased activations in several brain regions—including the bilateral occipital gyrus, left temporal gyrus, and bilateral middle frontal gyrus—compared to the encyclopedia group.

Transactive memory 
Sparrow et al. originally claimed that reliance on computers is a form of transactive memory, because people share information easily, forget what they think will be available later, and remember the location of information better than the information itself. They posited that people and their computers are becoming "interconnected systems"; the same underlying processes used in traditional transactive memory to learn who in our social networks know what is also being extended to encompass what a computer knows and how to find it.

The reliance on computers has raised concerns, such as when it prevents one from processing information and internalizing it. In addition, people appear less confident in recalling information learned through Internet searching and that recent Internet searching may promote motivation to use the Internet.

However, several researchers have questioned whether the Google effect is a form of transactive memory, arguing that no transaction is going on between the person and the computer. Therefore, computer networks and the Internet cannot be conceived as a distributed cognitive system. Rather, computers are merely tools exploited to help trigger a memory or to easily look up information. Unlike in traditional transactive memory, the information is not lost without the Internet, but merely slower and more difficult to find.

Replication 
In a big Replication study published in Nature 2018, the Google effect was one of the experiments which could not be replicated.

See also 
 External memory (psychology)
 Exocortex

References

External links
Link to the Kaspersky survey
An overview of the Google effect and its practical implications

Memory biases
Effect